Rajesh Jolly (Rājēśa Jaulī; born 20 August 1960) is an Indian actor who's been working with Bollywood films and is also a voice actor who has been participating in dubbing foreign films into the Hindi language, mostly for English language films. He is fluent into English, Hindi and Punjabi.

He first began his career in an Indian television sitcom, Flop Show, created and starring Jaspal Bhatti. Rajesh is now currently running an acting school as well.

Filmography

Live action television series

Live action films

Animated films

Dubbing career
Throughout Rajesh's career, he's been voicing for B-list characters and for various superheroes in Hindi-dubbed versions of Hollywood films, for over more than 18 years.

He has also Hindi-dubbed for animated films and television series, such as Commander Ulysses Feral from SWAT Kats: The Radical Squadron, Spike from Tom & Jerry and Bluto from Popeye when they were shown on Cartoon Network India.

Dubbing roles

Animated series

Live action films

Foreign language films

Indian films

Animated films

See also
Dubbing (filmmaking)
List of Indian Dubbing Artists

References

External links

1960 births
Male actors in Hindi cinema
21st-century Indian male actors
Indian male voice actors
Living people
Place of birth missing (living people)